Traad , also known as Traad Point, is a small peninsula near Ballyronan in County Londonderry, Northern Ireland. Located at the north-west of Lough Neagh, it has a large conservation area that is abundant with wildlife as well as a nine-hole golf club.  It is situated within Mid-Ulster District.

The Ulster Freshwater Laboratory
It contains the now abandoned Ulster Freshwater Laboratory at its easternmost extent, known as Traad Point. This laboratory was formerly the largest marine biology centre in the UK.

See also
List of villages in Northern Ireland
List of towns in Northern Ireland

External links

Geography of County Londonderry
Mid-Ulster District